The Leinegraben is a small river of Saxony, Germany. It flows into the Pleiße near Leipzig.

See also
List of rivers of Saxony

Rivers of Saxony
Rivers of Germany